Global Champion may refer to:

GFW Global Champion, a professional wrestling world heavyweight champion
Kaiser Knuckle, a 1994 fighting game